Caddo Parish Magnet High School (CMHS) is located in Shreveport, Louisiana, United States. Caddo Magnet was founded by its first principal, Ascension Smith. The school colors are gold and red, and the mascot is a Mustang. The current principal is Mr. Robert Middleton. The assistant principals include Dr. Cedric Ellis (attendance and discipline), Schannon Lanclos, and Kerri Miles (both curriculum and instruction).

Academic Decathlon
Caddo Magnet won the Academic Decathlon contest for Louisiana each year from 1983 through 2011.  This is the longest streak of any school in the nation, and the longest in the history of the competition.

Other awards

Students participating in varsity and lifetime sports have won district competitions and advanced to the state levels.  During the 2007-2008 season of High School Varsity soccer, the Caddo Magnet boys won the State Championship and were ranked as high as #2 in the nation by NSCAA (National Soccer Coaches of America Association).

Admissions

To be admitted to Caddo Magnet, students must:
Have a 2.5 grade point average at the time of application.
Have a score on the most recent school-administered nationally standardized test showing the reading level at the 50th percentile or better.
Have 95% or better school attendance.
Have maintained a good discipline record.
Express high motivation and interest toward excellence in the academics or the arts.
Have parental/guardian consent and support.
Have taken and passed the English/Language Arts and Math components of LEAP 21.

In order to remain in good standing at Caddo Magnet, students must:
Maintain a cumulative 2.5 grade point average.
Conform to behavior standards set by the Caddo Parish School Board and Caddo Magnet High School.

Clubs
Chess Club  
SAGA  
Model UN  
E-Sports  
Cyber Patriot  
Active Minds  
Asian Studies Association  
Astronomy Club  
Band  
Black Studies Association  
Choir  
Debate  
Destination Imagination  
National Honors Society  
World Language Club  
FCA  
Quiz Bowl  
Student Council  
Guitar Club  
Mock Trial  
Greens Club  
Pet Project  
UNICEF  
Drone Club  
Harry Potter Club  
Mu Alpha Theta  
Project Talent  
SLAM Club  
Key Club  
Creative Writing Club  
Interact Club  
Art Club  
History Club  
Electronic Club  
4-H  
Girl Up  
Tri-M Music Honors Society  
Robotics Team  
Science Olympiad  
Youth & Government  
Armory Club  
JROTC Rifle Team  
Drama Club  
Spread the Success  
Rocketry  
Engineering  
In Stitches  
French Honors Society  
German Honors Society  
Karaoke Club  
Letters for Rose  
Biology Olympiad  
Ambassadors  
JROTC Command  
Ping Pong  
Current Events Club

Athletics
Caddo Magnet High athletics competes in the LHSAA

Sports:
Archery  
Cross Country/Track  
Fencing    
Golf  
Gymnastics  
Lacrosse—Men's  
Soccer—Ladies'  
Soccer—Men's  
Softball  
Swimming  
Tennis  
Volleyball  
E-Sports

Alumni

See also 
Caddo Parish Schools

References

External links
 Caddo Magnet High School

Magnet schools in Louisiana
High schools in Shreveport, Louisiana
Public high schools in Louisiana